Zhu Tong is a fictional character in Water Margin, one of the four great classical novels in Chinese literature. Nicknamed "Lord of the Beautiful Beard", he ranks 12th among the 36 Heavenly Spirits, the first third of the 108 Stars of Destiny.

Background
A chief constable in Yuncheng County in present-day Shandong province, Zhu Tong is Eight chi and five cun tall and sports a beard one chi and five cun long. His sparkling eyes and long flowing beard give him a look resembling Guan Yu of the Three Kingdoms era. He is thus nicknamed, like Guan, "Lord with a Beautiful Beard".

Zhu Tong and fellow chief constable Lei Heng are close friends of Chao Gai, the headman of Dongxi village in Yuncheng. When Yuncheng receives an order from higher authorities to arrest Chao, who is found to have led the hijacking of birthday gifts being transported to Imperial Tutor Cai Jing in the imperial capital Dongjing, the job falls on Zhu Tong and Lei Heng to execute. Both want to help Chao escape, not knowing the other thinks the same. Zhu Tong prevails on Lei to break into Chao's house from the front while he himself blocks the rear knowing Chao would exit by that way. When Chao Gai, Wu Yong, Liu Tang and Gongsun Sheng charge out of the back gate, Zhu Tong ensures the way is cleared for them to flee.

Soon after Chao Gai is elected chief of Liangshan Marsh, he sends gifts to convey his gratitude to Zhu Tong and Song Jiang, who had warned him of the impending arrest, thus enabling him to make preparations to escape. Song kills his mistress Yan Poxi in anger when she threatens to report him after discovering the gifts and a letter from Chao revealing his connection to Liangshan. The magistrate orders Zhu Tong and Lei Heng to search for Song Jiang at his father's house. Zhu tells Lei Heng to watch over Song's father while he alone goes search for Song. As Song has earlier told him there is a pit under the floor in the study room good for hiding, Zhu heads to the spot, lifts the cover and finds him there.  However, Zhu tells Song to flee. He reports to the magistrate that Song could not be found.

Becoming an outlaw
Lei Heng gets into a money dispute with a songstress Bai Xiying and is arrested for beating her father. As he is shackled and tethered to a post outside the magistrate's office, his elderly mother comes to send him food. She gets into a quarrel with Bai, who insults and slaps her. Lei in anger smashes his cangue on the woman and kills her. The magistrate exiles him to Jizhou (薊州; present-day Ji County, Tianjin), with Zhu Tong to escort him there. Zhu releases Lei midway.  As the magistrate is fond of Zhu, he hands him a mitigated sentence of exile to Cangzhou.

In Cangzhou, Zhu Tong's impressive looks endear him to the local prefect, who lets him be an assistant in his office. The prefect's four-year-old son finds Zhu Tong's long exquisite beard charming and often wants to play with him. One night when Zhu is outdoor with the boy, Lei Heng and Wu Yong approach him to persuade him to join Liangshan. As he vehemently turns down their invitation, Li Kui, taking his cue from Wu Yong, takes away the child and hacks him to death. When Zhu finds the body of the boy, he is furious and wants to kill Li Kui. But Wu Yong and Lei Heng try to placate him. Seeing that he has no other choice, Zhu Tong reluctantly joins Liangshan, but on the condition that Li Kui is barred from returning to the stronghold..

Campaigns and later life
Zhu Tong is appointed as one of the Eight Tiger Cubs Vanguard Generals of the Liangshan cavalry after the 108 Stars of Destiny came together in what is called the Grand Assembly. He participates in the campaigns against the Liao invaders and rebel forces in Song territory following amnesty from Emperor Huizong for Liangshan.

He is one of the few heroes who survive the many campaigns. He accepts an official appointment and dedicates the rest of his life to serving the Song Empire.

References
 
 
 
 
 
 
 

36 Heavenly Spirits
Fictional characters from Shandong